Boris "Bo" Elik (October 17, 1929 – May 2, 2013) was a Canadian ice hockey left winger who played 3 games in the National Hockey League with the Detroit Red Wings during the 1962–63 season. The rest of his career, which lasted from 1950 to 1963, was spent in the minor leagues. He was born in Geraldton, Ontario in 1929 and died in Toronto, Ontario in 2013.

Career statistics

Regular season and playoffs

References

External links
 

1929 births
2013 deaths
Canadian ice hockey left wingers
Cleveland Barons (1937–1973) players
Detroit Red Wings players
Edmonton Flyers (WHL) players
Ice hockey people from Ontario
Northern Ontario Hockey Association players
People from Thunder Bay District
Pittsburgh Hornets players
Providence Reds players
Rochester Americans players